The Battle of Trekkopjes on 26 April 1915 was a German assault on the South African held railway station of Trekkopjes during the South West Africa Campaign of World War I. The South African Major Skinner had been ordered to defend Trekkopjes, and came into contact with a German column advancing on the station. Skinner withdrew back into Trekkopjes and dug in his forces. The German attack was repulsed with the help of armoured cars, leaving the South Africans victorious. The Battle of Trekkopjes saw the last German offensive in German South West Africa leaving them on the defensive for the remainder of the campaign.

Background
After losing significant ground to the South Africans under Botha, the German army under Franke in German Southwest Africa began preparations to go on the offensive again. By mid April it was decided to attack the South African held railway station of Trekkopjes, and a German scout plane had gathered intelligence of the South African forces holding the station.

Battle
At 5:45 A.M. the Germans appeared close to Trekkopjes and blew the rail line to the east of the camp in an attempt to prevent Allied reinforcements from arriving. By 7:40 the Germans began their attack on the Allied positions by shelling the encampment's tents with artillery. Since Colonel Skinner's men lacked artillery they were unable to respond to the German shelling, and waited until the Germans assaulted their position.

After five hours of fighting the South Africans forced the Germans to retreat by attacking their flanks with machine guns mounted in armoured cars.

Aftermath
Though neither side suffered heavy casualties, the German defeat greatly demoralized Franke's men. For the rest of the campaign the Germans would stay on the defensive and were pushed further and further back until the main body finally surrendered a few months later after the Battle of Otavi.

Citations

References

Historicus Africanus, Der 1. Weltkrieg in Deutsch-Südwestafrika 1914/15, Volume 6, Aufgabe der Zentralregionen, Windhoek 2017, 

Trekkopjes
Trekkopjes
Trekkopjes
Trekkopjes
Trekkopjes
Trek
April 1915 events